"All Cried Out" is a song by British house duo Blonde. It features vocals from American singer and actor Alex Newell.

Track listing
Digital download
"All Cried Out" (featuring Alex Newell) – 2:50

Digital download – EP
"All Cried Out" (Extended Mix) – 4:15
"All Cried Out" (Don Diablo Remix) – 4:29
"All Cried Out" (The Magician Remix) – 4:38
"All Cried Out" (Martin Ikin Remix) – 5:36
"All Cried Out" (99 Souls Remix) – 3:37
"All Cried Out" (Oliver Nelson Remix) – 5:26

Charts and certifications

Charts

Year-end charts

Certifications

References

2015 singles
2015 songs
Blonde (duo) songs
Parlophone singles
Songs written by Lucas Secon
Songs written by Cass Lowe
Songs written by Raye (singer)
Songs written by Jacob Manson
Song recordings produced by Mark Ralph (record producer)